William Edward McLaren (December 15, 1831 - February 19, 1905) was the Bishop of Chicago (formerly Illinois) in the Episcopal Church from 1875 until his death in 1905.

Early life and education
McLaren was born on December 15, 1831, in Geneva, New York, the son of the Reverend John Finley McLaren, a Scottish Presbyterian minister. He was educated at the Western University of Pennsylvania and at the Jefferson College from where he graduated with a Bachelor of Arts in 1851. In 1854 he earned his Master of Arts from Jefferson. Later he started teaching and was involved i journalism. He commenced studies for the ministry in 1857 at the Pittsburgh Theological Seminary, aiming to become a missionary in China. He was awarded a Doctor of Divinity from Racine College in 1873 while Sewanee: The University of the South awarded him with a Doctor of Civil Law in 1882.

Ordained ministry
McLaren was ordained a Presbyterian priest in 1860. He became engaged in missionary work in Bogotá, Colombia however he returned to the United States two years later due to ill health. In 1871 McLaren joined the Episcopal Church and on July 29, 1872, he was ordained a deacon in St. John's Church in Detroit. He was ordained a priest a few months later in October.

Episcopacy

McLaren was elected Bishop of Illinois in 1875 and was consecrated on December 8, 1875, by the Bishop of Michigan Samuel A. McCoskry. He became the first bishop to hold the title of Bishop of Chicago after the name of the diocese was changed in 1877. He is remembered as being the founder of the Western Theological Seminary in 1881. He died in office in New York City on February 19, 1905, and was buried at Rosehill Cemetery in Chicago.

Works
He was the author of several books, including The Practice of the Interior Life and Earnest Contention for the Faith.

See also

 List of bishops of the Episcopal Church in the United States of America

References

External links
 

1831 births
1905 deaths
McLaren
19th-century American Episcopalians
Episcopal bishops of Chicago
19th-century American clergy